General elections were held in Mexico on October 1 and 15, 1911.

Background
The 1910 elections were intended to be the first free elections of the Porfiriato, but after opposition leader Francisco I. Madero appeared poised to upset the Porfirian regime, he was arrested and imprisoned before the election was held.  Despite Madero's popularity, Diaz was controversially announced as the election winner with almost 99% of the votes. The elections were subsequently rigged and the results not recognized by Madero, who then published the Plan of San Luis Potosí in October 1910 that served to incite the Mexican Revolution.

Results

President

Vice-President

References

Mexico
1911 elections in Mexico
Presidential elections in Mexico
Election and referendum articles with incomplete results